Cressy  is a town in Victoria, Australia, approximately  north of Colac on the Ballarat road. It is divided between Golden Plains Shire, the Shire of Colac Otway, and Corangamite Shire. At the 2016 census, Cressy and the surrounding area had a population of 175.

History
George Russell, manager of the pastoral Clyde Company, opened up the area to European settlement in 1836. In 1837, a French man named Jean Duverney crossed the Woady Yaloak River, claimed land on both banks, and named the area "Frenchman's Run". Duverney called the small, developing village Cressy, after Crécy in France, where he was born.

The Cressy Post Office opened on 1 January 1858.

After the outbreak of World War II, an airfield was constructed south of the town towards Colac, and was used by the RAAF until 1946 as a combat training base and for bombing practice. Two large Bellman hangars were used for aircraft maintenance. Several RAAF aircraft crashed in the vicinity during the war.

Railways

The first railway to reach Cressy was an extension of the line from Colac to Beeac. It opened in December 1910, and by September 1911, the line had been extended north to Newtown, where it joined the line to Ballarat. In September 1910, work began at Cressy on the Western Plains Railway. This line joined the line to Ararat at Maroona, and the lines to Geelong at Gheringhap. Cressy, being at the junction of the two cross-country lines, became an important railway center, with extensive buildings, railway yards, and a turntable. Buildings included station offices, refreshment rooms, and an elevated signal box. The line from Colac to Newtown was closed in 1953. Few traces of Cressy station now remain.

Cressy in the 21st century
A variety of old buildings remain in Cressy, although many were destroyed in the fires of 1977, which also killed three people. There are two churches remaining, and the Cressy Historical Society is now housed in the Presbyterian Church, opposite the old Post Office and general store. The church was built in 1862, and is open for research on the first Sunday of every month. The Cressy police station closed in 2010. The old post office and a telephone exchange were built in 1924 for £5,000. After it was closed, it was turned into a family home, and subsequently opened as a café and mixed business, which operated until 2014.

The town football team went into recess in 1998, after the Western Plains FL merged with the Lexton FL.

References

External links

 Historic photo of Cressy Post Office State Library, Victoria, accessed 23 March 2015

Towns in Victoria (Australia)